Emil Pettersson (born 14 January 1994) is a Swedish professional ice hockey player for Timrå IK of the Swedish Hockey League (SHL). Pettersson was selected by the Nashville Predators in the 6th round (155th overall) of the 2013 NHL Entry Draft. Emil's brother Elias was drafted fifth overall by the Vancouver Canucks in the 2017 NHL Entry Draft.

Playing career
Pettersson made his Elitserien (now the SHL) debut playing with Timrå IK during the 2012–13 Elitserien season.

In the 2016–17 season, having signed with Skellefteå AIK, Pettersson played in 24 games before he was transferred mid-season to join his fourth SHL club in the Växjö Lakers, on 7 December 2016. Pettersson quickly adapted with the Lakers, completing the season with 26 points in 27 games.

On 9 May 2017, Pettersson agreed to a two-year, entry-level contract with the Nashville Predators. He joined the Predators American Hockey League affiliate, the Milwaukee Admirals for the 2017–18 season. During the season, Pettersson and teammate Anders Lindbäck were named to the 2018 AHL All-Star Classic. In playing the full year with the Admirals, Pettersson led the team in scoring with 33 assists and 46 points in 72 regular season games.

In the following 2018–19 season, Pettersson continued to lead the Admirals offence, compiling 33 points in 49 games before he was traded by the Predators to the Arizona Coyotes in exchange for Laurent Dauphin and Adam Helewka on 8 February 2019. He was immediately assigned to continue in the AHL with Coyotes affiliate, the Tucson Roadrunners.

Having completed his contract in North America, and playing exclusively in the AHL, Pettersson left as an impending restricted free agent from the Coyotes. On 13 June 2019, he agreed to a two-year contract to return to Sweden with former club, the Växjö Lakers of the SHL.

In helping the Lakers claim the Le Mat Trophy in his final season under contract in 2020–21, Pettersson embarked on a new challenge in securing a one-year contract with Russian-based, HC Spartak Moscow of the Kontinental Hockey League (KHL), on 13 July 2021. In his lone season with Spartak, Pettersson contributed with 13 goals and 24 points through 42 regular season games. In helping Spartak qualify for the post-season, he collected an assist in 5 playoff appearances.

As a free agent, Pettersson opted to return to the SHL and sign a five-year contract with original club, Timrå IK, on 8 April 2022.

Personal life
Pettersson is of Finnish descent through his paternal grandfather, born Toivo Jokelainen, who was sent to Sweden in 1941 as a Finnish war child.

Career statistics

Awards and honours

References

External links
 

1994 births
Living people
Milwaukee Admirals players
Modo Hockey players
Nashville Predators draft picks
Skellefteå AIK players
HC Spartak Moscow players
Swedish ice hockey centres
Swedish people of Finnish descent
Timrå IK players
Tucson Roadrunners players
Växjö Lakers players
People from Sundsvall
Sportspeople from Västernorrland County